Gisozi, also Kisozi is a settlement in central Burundi and capital of the commune of the same name. It is located in Mwaro Province, to the southeast of Bujumbura (the largest city and former capital of Burundi) and southwest of Gitega (the current capital).

References

Populated places in Burundi